Children of Fate: Life and Death in a Sicilian Family is a 1993 documentary film about life in the slums of Palermo, Sicily, directed by Andrew Young and Susan Todd.

Synopsis
The film is a sequel to Cortile Cascino, a 1961 documentary shot by Andrew Young's father, Robert M. Young, which depicted the eponymous Palermo slum and told the story of Angela Capra and her family. Children of Fate picks up the story 30 years on, showing Capra now separated from her husband, and the fates of her children.

Awards
The film was nominated for an Academy Award for Best Documentary Feature.

References

External links

1993 films
American documentary films
American black-and-white films
Documentary films about poverty
Documentary films about Sicily
1993 documentary films
Documentary films about families
Films set in Palermo
1990s English-language films
1990s American films